Yakuza refers to traditional organized crime groups in Japan and members thereof.

Yakuza may also refer to:
 The Yakuza, a 1974 film by Sydney Pollack
 Yakuza Fury a 2005 video game and part of the Simple series
 Like a Dragon (franchise), a series of video games by Sega known as Yakuza outside Japan until 2022
 Yakuza (video game), the first game in the series, released in 2005
 Yakuza (band), an avant-garde metal band from Chicago
 Yakuza, a French comic by François Corteggiani

See also
 Yakuza film, or yakuza eiga, the Japanese film genre depicting organized crime